Eric Roy may refer to:

 Eric Roy (footballer) (born 1967), French footballer
 Eric Roy (politician) (born 1948), New Zealand politician